Produce Camp 2021 (Chinese: 创造营2021; pinyin: ChuàngZàoYíng 2021), officially CHUANG 2021, was the fourth and final season of Produce 101 China, a Chinese idol survival show. The show brought 90 male trainees from different countries and agencies, to form an 11-member international boy group through global viewers' votes. The final 11 trainees debuted as INTO1.

It premiered on February 17, the show was broadcast on Tencent Video and WeTV every Wednesday and Saturday at 7pm CST (UTC+8), with subtitles available in several languages. The grand finale was streamed live on 24 April 2021 at Tencent Video and WeTV.

Background 
Produce Camp 2021 held a global audition and had gathered 90 trainees who are accepting several challenges to fight for a spot in the newest boyband in mainland China. One of the trainees Kazuma left the show due to personal reasons. To foster their skills and talents, the trainees will undergo mission, training, and assessment with the guidance of the six mentors. The show is being filmed in Hainan Island and the recording started in January 2021. The first week will have a double stream of episodes on Wednesday and Saturday and it will resume in its regular timeslot on the later episodes. In the end, 11 trainees will be chosen to form a group.

Production style 
In August 2020, Tencent Video released an annual press conference, announcing the launching of "Produce Camp 2021" recruiting trainees worldwide. It was first rumored that the fourth season will be a co-ed of male and female trainees, but the official Sina Weibo account rejected the rumor.

Tencent Videos released a Produce Camp game pixel style logo on January 1, 2021, and later reveal the logo with its slogan "冒險島的召喚" or "Call of Adventure Islands".

Mentors

Main mentors 
In October 2020, Tencent Video announced that it would create its fourth season of its Produce China series, with Deng Chao as the nation's producer. In January 2021, Tencent Videos announced five new additional mentors, namely; Zhou Shen, Amber Liu, Ning Jing, Zhou Zhennan of R1SE; and Nene/Zheng Naixin of BonBon Girls 303 as international assistant.

Guest mentors

Guest performers

Episodes

Episode 1.1 (February 17, 2021) 
Ninety trainees from Mainland China, Taiwan, Hong Kong, and some parts across the globe, including Japan, the United States, Thailand, Russia, and Ukraine, are gathered to test their fate and talents be part of the newest boyband in Mainland China. Companies introduce trainees before the six mentors go inside the gathered hall. Unlike in the Korean counterpart, the trainees are seated according to their comfort without any rank numbers in their seat. The audition show started with the mentors' performance: Ning Jing performing 《Julia》, Amber Liu performing 《Shake That Brass》, Zhou Shen performing 《自己按门铃自己听》, Zhou Zhennan performing 《C》, and Deng Chao performing Produce Camp 2019's theme song 《喊出我的名字》. In addition, a new set of rules is imposed to the show; the mentors have no longer the power to decide the trainees' rankings. For the first time, in every seat of the trainees and the mentors, a voting device was installed on their seats and each ranking results are jointly decided by the trainees and the mentors. After the mentors' performances, contestants perform with their label mates or a pre-made group to be evaluated from grades A, B, C, and F. After the Jaywalk Newjoy's performance, it was later revealed that the debuting group will consist of 11 members. It was also revealed that the first Class A students were Zhou Keyu, Oscar, and Lin Mo. The episode was cut when Santa was fatigued after his individual performance while being treated by the medical experts on the show.

Episode 1.2 (February 20, 2021) 
The evaluations continued on the next day when Santa was fully-recovered. Everyone watched the taped performance of Santa and Rikumaru once more for everyone to evaluate the both of them. Santa received a perfect score from the joint votes of the mentors and trainees. Halfway through the show, another set of Class A students was revealed, and the current Class A students, Zhou Keyu, Oscar, and Lin Mo were demoted to Class B because they are outvoted from the recent trainees who performed. Seven were named as the new members of Class A, namely Yu Yang, Li Jiaxiang, Santa, Rikimaru, Hu Yetao, Bo Yuan, and Yu Gengyin. The episode ended with the intense special dance battle between Santa, Liu Yu, and Xue Bayi, with Liu Yu's rank being not revealed in the episode.

Episode 2 (February 27, 2021) 
Three more performances were evaluated before revealing who will be occupying the final 11 in Class A. None of the current Class A students were demoted while Liu Yu and Han Peiquan claimed the 8th and 9th spots on the Class A. The 10th and 11th spots were battled between Lin Mo, Hiroto, and Dai Shaodong. In the end, it was Dai Shaodong and Lin Mo who occupied the remaining Class A seats, while Hiroto retained as a Class B trainee. Deng Chao announced that there would be a battle between the recommended students of the five mentors (Deng Chao, Ning Jing, Zhou Shen, Amber Liu, and Zhou Zhennan) versus the opponent from Class A which the recommended students chose. If the recommended students fail the challenge, they will be directly demoted to Class F, and if the recommended trainees succeeded, they will go into Class A, and the mentioned opponent will be demoted to Class B. After all trainees were evaluated, they moved to their dorms and chose the bedrooms according to their likings, yet it is a first-come, first-served basis. The episode ended as Zhou Zhennan introduced the 14 songs that are up for grabs for the upcoming 1st evaluations. The trainees can pick their desired song according to their rank, and each song has a certain limit of team members. The centers are not yet decided, but there are three guidelines on how to choose it: (1) if there's only one Class A student in a group, that trainee will automatically be the center of that group; (2) if there are more than one Class A trainees in one song, the selection of center will be decided by the members through voting; (3) if there are no Class A trainees in a team, the center will be decided by all the team members through voting. 

Below is the initial class of the 90 trainees:

Episode 3.1 (March 03, 2021) 
The trainees are facing a new mission on their 1st public evaluation stage battle as it determines their new class as a trainee. The team with the highest votes in this public performance will automatically be the new Class A students. Despite feeling the pressure of the challenge, the trainees still have time to get together and do recreational activities on the beach to unwind and relax. Trainees are threatened by the teams《莲 / LIT》 and 《Yummy》, as they see these two groups as the strongest groups. An activity was conducted to decide which groups will battle with another group. The group that will face PK are as follows: (1) 《超级冠军 / Football Gang》 vs《莲 / LIT》; (2) 《Lover Boy 88》 vs 《Radio》; (3) 《女孩 / Girl》 vs 《Yummy》; (4) 《ME!》 vs 《醉拳 / Drunken Master》; (5) 《霓虹甜心 / Neon Dancing》 vs《爱you ready, 爱你ready / Are (Love) You Ready, I'm (Love Me) Ready?》; (6) 《作为怪物 / As a Monster》 vs 《破茧 / Break the Cocoon》; and (7) 《Butter-Fly》 vs 《我欢喜喜欢你 / I Joyfully Like You》. Three battles had already performed, with 《作为怪物 / As a Monster》,《莲 / LIT》, and 《Butter-Fly》 being hailed as the winners of their respective battles.

Episode 3.2 (March 06, 2021) 
Four pairs of performances are waiting to be disclosed before knowing the votes they received on the 1st stage evaluations and their new class evaluations. The teams who performed 《女孩 / Girl》, 《醉拳 / Drunken Master》, 《Lover Boy 88》, and爱you ready, 爱你ready / Are (Love) You Ready, I'm (Love Me) Ready?》 won on their respective battles. The team 《LIT》, composed of Rikimaru, Liu Yu, Ren Yinpeng, Yi Han, Li Luoer, Luo Yan, and Xu Shaolan are hailed to be the most voted group among the 14 performances and they all automatically become the new members in Class A. Deng Chao also revealed the top 4 trainees among the winning teams who have the most individual votes cast for them will be also joining as the new members of Class A, Wei Ziyue (118 points), Hiroto (117 points), Hu Yetao (114 points), and Wu Yuheng (108 points). A surprise stage performance was performed by their seniors R1SE that was revealed they will also be demonstrating the choreography of this season's theme song.

Episode 4.1 (March 12, 2021) 
After the 1st Public Evaluations Stage, R1SE performed the Chinese lyrics of this year's theme song 《我们一起闯》 while Amber Liu performed the English lyrics 《Chuang, To-Gather, Go!》. All trainees were shocked to hear that they would be required to memorize the choreography and learn both the Chinese and English lyrics of the song. Many of the trainees struggle with the languages they are fluent in and the challenge to memorize everything in a short period of time. All 90 trainees are evaluated by the mentors and there are drastic changes among the trainees' new class. Rikimaru, Liu Yu, Wu Yuheng, and Hu Yetao who were previously evaluated as Class A in the 1st Public Evaluations Stage have retained their ranks in which the mentors gave them high remarks in maintaining their grade. Lai Yaoxiang who was evaluated as Class F back-to-back had risen to Class A. Among the new set of Class A students, Liu Yu was voted to become the center of the music video. Liu Yu vowed that he will break the center curse since in the Produce China series, all of the centers in the music videos didn't end up in the debuting group.

Episode 4.2 (March 12, 2021) 
The trainees were asked to do a rearrangement of the official theme song by interpreting it in their own preferred styles and perform it. This task was given as an opportunity to the trainees to show their talent and potential and appeal to the audience. Trainees are free to choose members to make a team with a minimum of 5 people and a maximum of 11 people. Less than a week, the trainees performed in the presence of the national producer, Deng Chao and mentors are Ning Jing, Zhou Shen and Amber Liu.

Episode 5 (March 20, 2021) 
Before starting the announcement of the first elimination, trainees are interviewed by the media. The first elimination round took place, Liu Yu from BiuBiu Culture ranked 1st place, while He Yijun from Jaywalk Newjoy ranked 55th. Those ranked 56th-90th were eliminated. With the most shocking elimination being Lai Yaoxiang who managed to go from F class to A class.

Episode 6.1 (March 27, 2021) 
After the first elimination, 60 trainees entered the 2nd Public Evaluation Stage. This evaluation stage is divided into three professional directions is Dance, Vocal and Composition. Trainees watch all professional direction assessment performance track demo video and fill in their professional direction assessment of the first, second and third volunteer, forming 5 dance teams 《Believer》, 《化身孤島的鯨 / The Whale Incarnates Inside the Isolated Island》,《爱情鸟 / Love Birds》, 《Therefore, I Am》 and 《被螃蟹钳了一下下 (ปูหนีบอีปิ) / Crab Dance》; 3 vocal bands 《Lemon》, 《我管你 / I Don't Care》 and《你就不要想起我 / You Better Not Think About Me》; and 3 composition teams (each of them presented the vocal team rearranging song, dance team making choreography, and rap team writing lyrics and composing song) of 11 teams. Each group is limited to five places, and if the excess is excluded according to the ranking, the lower ranked participants will be transferred to the second or third volunteer. The first part of the 2nd Evaluation Performance Stage took place are 《Believer》, 《Lemon》, 《化身孤島的鯨 / The Whale Incarnates Inside the Isolated Island》,《爱情鸟 / Love Birds》, and 《峰项 / Highed-peak Item》 composition rap team. The last episode 6 part 1, 《峰项 / Highed-peak Item》 team while still remaining in the position of Best Performance on the 2nd Evaluation.

Episode 6.2 (March 28, 2021) 
The second part of the 2nd Evaluation Performance Stage took place are 《Fix Me》 composition vocal team, 《我管你 / I Don't Care》, 《Therefore, I Am》, 《Joker》 composition dance team, 《被螃蟹钳了一下下 (ปูหนีบอีปิ) / Crab Dance》 and《你就不要想起我 / You Better Not Think About Me》. At the end of the 2nd Public Evaluation Stage, Deng Chao also revealed 《峰项 / Highed-peak Item》 team is the Best Performance. Meanwhile, the Best MVPs are Liu Zhang from 《峰项 / Highed-peak Item》 team, and Nine from《你就不要想起我 / You Better Not Think About Me》 team with the same total votes is 174 points.

Episode 7 (April 03, 2021) 
The trainees had their Inside Part Sports festival. In this festival, lead host by mentor Zhou Shen and co-host from trainees are Shao Mingming, Han Peiquan, Nine and Qu Boyu. Teams were formed based on class, led by mentors Zhou Zhennan (A), Amber Liu (B) and Nene (C). The second elimination round took place, Zhou Keyu from Jaywalk Newjoy ranked 1st place, while independent trainee Jing Long ranked 33rd. Those ranked 34th-55th were eliminated.

Episode 8 (April 10, 2021) 
After the second elimination, 33 trainees entered the 3rd Public Evaluation Stage. The evaluation stage is revealed to be a concept evaluation. Trainees listen to the demos of six original songs and watch all professionally-directed assessment performance track demo videos. For each original song, viewers chose one trainee to be center using a week-long online poll. The centers are Mika《输入法可爱按第五 / Encode "Cute" and Press Five》, Santa 《Nana Party》, Caelan《卫星XL / Satellite XL》, Liu Yu 《冒险计划 / Adventure Plan》, Rikimaru 《璧 / Jade》 and Lin Mo 《下雨了是我在想你 / It's Raining, I'm Thinking of You》. The remaining trainees can choose songs based on the last ranking. The mentors announces that there will be six female idol seniors joining in the performances and each team tries to guess who they are. Before getting into the core of 3rd Evaluation Performance Stage, the 《峰项 / Highed-peak Item》 team, the Best Performance team from last evaluation, performs a special stage. Because the teammate Luo Yan was eliminated, his position was replaced by the other Best MVP, Nine, and they performed Happy by Pharrell Williams. The guest female idol seniors are announced to be Ju Jingyi with Mika team, Mao Xiaotong with Santa team, Amber Liu with Caelan team, Meng Meiqi with Liu Yu team, Liu Xiening with RIkimaru team, and Nene with Lin Mo team. At the end of the 2nd Public Evaluation Stage, Deng Chao revealed that 《输入法可爱按第五 / Encode "Cute" and Press Five》 team won and the Best MVP is Nine, with a total of 200 points.

Contestants 

Color key

Ranking
 New Top 11

Note: On Episode 10, Phases 1 and 2 refers to the time of voting that is open to the Citizen Producers.

Result

The finale was held on April 24, 2021, and was broadcast live. The final eleven members debuted as (INTO1).

CHUANG 2021: Are You a Werewolf? 
CHUANG 2021: Are You A Werewolf?, an immersive game reality show, is a derivative show of 《CHUANG 2021》. Trainees in themed costumes will become game players in another dimension, get through all passes and achieve the final victory. In the process, the outstanding intelligence, physical power and humor of the trainees will be shown.

 Winners of the Episode

Discography

Singles 

*The Whale Transformed Into An Isolated Island 《化身孤岛的鲸》-  Zhou Shen's Version

Franchise

References

External links
 

Chinese reality television series
Mandarin-language television shows